John Harford may refer to:

John Harford (MP) for Coventry (UK Parliament constituency)
John Scandrett Harford, British banker, benefactor and abolitionist
Sir John Charles Harford, 1st Baronet (1860–1934), of the Harford baronets
Sir (John) Timothy Harford, 3rd Baronet (1932–2010), of the Harford baronets
John Harford, birth name of John Hartford (1937–2001), American folk, country, and bluegrass composer and musician

See also
Harford (disambiguation)